Samy Moustafa (born 13 January 1998) is an Egyptian freestyle wrestler. He represented Egypt at the 2019 African Games held in Rabat, Morocco and he won the silver medal in the men's freestyle 74 kg event.

In 2017, he won the gold medal in the 74 kg event at the African Wrestling Championships held in Marrakesh, Morocco.

References

External links 
 

Living people
1998 births
Place of birth missing (living people)
Egyptian male sport wrestlers
African Games silver medalists for Egypt
African Games medalists in wrestling
Competitors at the 2019 African Games
Mediterranean Games medalists in wrestling
Mediterranean Games silver medalists for Egypt
Competitors at the 2018 Mediterranean Games
20th-century Egyptian people
21st-century Egyptian people